Giuseppe Valentini (July 1900 – 16 November 1979) was an Italian priest and albanologist of the 20th century.

He was born in 1900 in Padova where he studied theology as a Jesuit priest. In 1922 he moved to Albania as a missionary and actively participated in magazines such as Lajmetari i Zemres s'Jezu Krishtit, and Leka, which he directed since 1932. During World War II he became a professor of the Albanian language in the University of Palermo.

Valentini is the author of several important works on Albanian history, law, numismatics, and sacred art.

In 1940 Valentini was one of the founders and general secretary of the Royal Institute of the Albanian Studies, the predecessor institute of the Academy of Sciences of Albania.

Sources 

Albanologists
Italian lexicographers
Linguists from Italy
20th-century Italian historians
20th-century Italian Jesuits
1900 births
1979 deaths
Clergy from Padua
20th-century Italian male writers
Italian male non-fiction writers
Italian–Albanian translators
Albanian–Italian translators
20th-century linguists
20th-century translators
Academic staff of the University of Palermo
20th-century lexicographers